"In a Place of Lesser Men" is a song by Canadian singer-songwriter Matthew Good. It was released as the lead single from Good's fifth solo album, Lights of Endangered Species. The song was first streamed via SoundCloud on March 21 and was officially released on March 29, 2011.

Charts

Credits
 Blake Manning: Drums
 Brenda Fedoruk: Flute
 David Owen: Cor Anglais
 Jennifer Zall: Backing Vocal
 Stuart Cameron: Guitar, Lap Steel
 Matthew Good: Piano, Bass, Guitar, Vocals

References

2011 singles
Matthew Good songs
Songs written by Matthew Good
2011 songs